A list of American films released in 1954. 
On the Waterfront won the Academy Award for Best Picture.

A-B

C-D

E-F

G-H

I-K

L-N

O-R

S-T

U-Z

Documentaries

Serials

Shorts

See also
 1954 in the United States

References

External links

1954 films at the Internet Movie Database

1954
Films
Lists of 1954 films by country or language